Maryam Mosque, or the Mary Mosque, also known as the Galway Mosque is an Ahmadi Muslim mosque, named in honour of Mary, mother of Jesus. The mosque is located in Galway, Connacht, Ireland. Opened in 2014 by Mirza Masroor Ahmad, the fifth caliph, it is the first purpose-built mosque in County Galway. The Irish born convert to Islam Iman Ibrahim Noonan is based in Galway.

In July 2019 the mosque was vandalised, with windows and locks broken, and equipment stolen.

See also
 Islam in the Republic of Ireland

References

2014 establishments in Ireland
Ahmadiyya mosques in the Republic of Ireland
Mosques completed in 2014
Religious buildings and structures in Galway (city)
21st-century architecture in the Republic of Ireland